Sanaa AlSarghali (born February 2, 1987) is the first Palestinian woman to hold a PhD in constitutional law in the State of Palestine, a Palestinian researcher in the field of law and constitution, a professor of constitutional law at the College of Law at An-Najah National University, and founder and director of the Center for Constitutional Studies at An-Najah University. She holds the UNESCO Chair for Democracy, Human Rights and Peace. she is the 9th member in the Palestinian Constitution Drafting Committee, where she was appointed by the legislative arm of the Palestine Liberation Organization.

Her life and educational attainment
Sanaa Samir Hussein Abdullah Al-Sarghali was born in Tulkarm on February 2, 1987, and finished her secondary education at Al-Adawiya Girls Secondary School in the city. She  is the third child for Sameer Al Sarghali and Raja Hajqasem, both pharmacists from Tulkarm. Her maternal grandmother is a Jewish immigrant from Poland who married her Palestinian grandfather in 1937 in Jerusalem, after their marriage her grandmother converted to Islam and lived in Tulkarm.

In 2005, she enrolled at An-Najah National University in Nablus, where she graduated in 2009 with a law degree. After graduating top of her class, she was awarded an -Najah University master scholarship to UK. In (2009) she joined Durham University to study International Trade and Commercial Law, She graduated  in 2010 with an LLM and in 2011 she joined Lancaster University to complete her PhD in constitutional law, becoming the first Palestinian woman to obtain a PhD in constitutional law. During her time as an Assistant Dean for Graduate College at Lancaster University, she started the New Café for PhD Students which became one of the most attractive hubs for PhDs to share their work and find collaborations between different specializations.  After only two years of her graduation she was awarded in December 2018 Sanaa received the Outstanding Alumni Award from Lancaster University. The Alumni Award recognizes Lancaster graduates who have made a ‎substantial contribution in their field and have developed an outstanding national or ‎international reputation amongst their peers.

Media Work
Dr. Alsarghali has been working with Women Media and Development since she was nineteen years old. She previously hosted a TV program while she was a university student titled: ‘TAM TIME’ focusing on changing the stereotypical imagine of Palestinian women in the Media where most of the guests where strong women able to discuss various topics related to Palestine. She interned at Al-Fajer TV station in Tulkrem and hosted various shows She started creating educational movies during the Palestinian constitutional awareness campaigns. She is an alumnus of Annenberg-Oxford Media Policy Summer Institute. She started creating educational movies during the Palestinian constitutional awareness campaigns.

Activism
In 2016 she was elected as a Chairwoman of Board of Directors for Women Media and Development (TAM), and became the youngest elected chairwoman for an active NGO in Palestine. She has been the spokesperson of TAM in many campaigns promoting women's Rights.  She also spoke on behalf of TAM in CSW Side event at the United Nations regarding social and economic rights for women under occupation, her speech was received with two minutes applaud when she mentioned that she feels so proud to hold the Palestinian passport regardless of the Trump administration and Israel's policy to destroy the Palestinian identity and make youth look for better lives outside Palestine.

In 2019 she was chosen by Care International in West Bank and Gaza to be the role model for women public participation. She has given a motivation speech in almost all Palestinian universities encouraging young females to take part in political participation.  In 2020 she gave a talk at the Australian Parliament in Canberra about constitutional building in Palestine.

Constitutional Awareness Campaigns
Dr. Alsarghali was one of the main initiators and the leading legal expert in the Constitutional Awareness Campaign titled: “My Constitution Should Include Me” aims to contribute to the creation of a comprehensive transitional Palestinian constitution that takes into account having women as main contributors in it, and how such document can be drafted while still under occupation. The Campaign was launched to the public on October 10, 2020, in cooperation between Women Media and Development (TAM), the Constitutional Studies Center at An-Najah National University and the General Union of Palestinian Women. The campaign included several activities such as webinar trainings for university student in West Bank and Gaza, and “Women, Constitutions and Constitution-Making” by the Constitution Transformation Network which is based in Melbourne, Australia.  Furthermore, during the campaign she directed ten movies that were produced and promoted on websites and social media platforms, including Facebook, Instagram and Twitter. The first Constitutional Campaign was launched in collaboration between the Constitutional Studies Center, the Palestinian Constitutional Court, the Palestinian Initiative for the Promotion of ‎‎ Global Dialogue and Democracy (Miftah), and Women Media and Development (TAM) in 2019. It aimed at discussing the Constitutional Principles of the Palestinian Constitution.
Previous to the campaigns, she has initiated the idea of arranging the first international constitutional building conference at An-Najah University and the second one where it focused on the role of women in parliaments. In addition, she has been the organizer of various webinars and conferences internationally and locally.

Academic affiliations
She is a fellow at the Richardson Institute and SEPAD project where her work focusses on sectarianism and Constitutional Identity. She has published on Constitutional identities in Bahrain, Lebanon and Palestine.

Her work in Palestine focuses mostly on Constitutional design, and in particular the semi-presidential system in Palestine. Her work has been citied locally and internationally, and she is often invited to international conferences to talk about constitutional building process in Palestine.

Sanaa has been awarded with many prestigious fellowships and among them is The Kathleen Fitzpatrick Visiting Fellow in Constitutional Law at Melbourne University in July and August 2020.

Awards
Outstanding Alumni Award by Lancaster University

References

Palestinian women academics
Palestinian diplomats
Academic staff of An-Najah National University
Academics of Durham University
People from Tulkarm
Living people
1987 births
Alumni of Durham University